Allokutzneria oryzae is a bacterium from the genus Allokutzneria which has been isolated from the rhizospheric soil from the rice-plant (Oryza sativa).

References

Pseudonocardiales
Bacteria described in 2014